Trevose Golf & Country Club is a 27-hole golf club in Cornwall, England which has hosted many of the leading amateur golf tournaments in Britain, including the Brabazon Trophy and professional events on the European Senior Tour.

History
The land on which the course was built was acquired by Dr. Pension Williams in the early 1920s and early excavations of the site identified a holy well which allegedly dates from the third century which is located adjacent to the remains of St Constantine's Chapel.

The championship course was designed by Harry Colt and opened for play in 1925. The club was subsequently acquired by John C. Gammon together with another member in 1941 and subsequently acquired the whole of the club in 1955. The Gammon family have continued to oversee the management of the club since this date.

In 2012 the club published a book detailing the history of the club titled 'Trevose Golf & Country Club – A Golfing Gem on the North Cornwall Coast' which included a foreword by Peter Alliss.

The championship course as regularly been ranked as one of the top links courses in England.

Tournaments hosted
The championship course has hosted a number of professional and amateur golf tournaments:

Amateur tournaments
The championship course hosted the Brabazon Trophy in 2008 which was won by Steven Uzzell of England with a 19 under par score of 197 in a tournament that was shortened to 54 holes as a result of adverse weather conditions. The championship course also hosted the McGregor Trophy for the English Boys Under 16 Open Amateur Stroke-Play Championship in 2012.

Professional tournaments
In 2019 Ian Woosnam announced that Trevose would be the host course for the Farmfoods European Legends Links Championship

Course scorecards

See also
List of golf courses in the United Kingdom

References

External links

Golf clubs and courses in Cornwall
Golf clubs and courses designed by Harry Colt
1925 establishments in England